Calmness is the mental state of peace of mind being free from agitation, excitement, or disturbance. It also refers being in a state of serenity, tranquillity, or peace. Calmness can most easily occur for the average person during a state of relaxation, but it can also be found during much more alert and aware states. Some people find that focusing the mind on something external, such as studying, or even internal, such as the breathing, can itself be very calming.

Childhood origins
Parental soothing (by rocking, holding etc.) in infancy lays the foundations of the capacity to self-calm. Thereafter transitional objects can help maintain calmness, while pets as self-objects also promote soothing and calm.

Cultivating calmness

Calmness is a quality that can be cultivated and increased with practice, or developed through psychotherapy. It usually takes a trained mind to stay calm in the face of a great deal of different stimulation, and possible distractions, especially emotional ones. The negative emotions are the greatest challenge to someone who is attempting to cultivate a calm mind. Some disciplines that promote and develop calmness are prayer, yoga, tai chi, martial arts, theatre arts, gardening, relaxation training, breath training, and meditation. Jon Kabat-Zinn states that "Concentration is a cornerstone of mindfulness practice. Your mindfulness will only be as robust as the capacity of your mind to be calm and stable. Without calmness, the mirror of mindfulness will have an agitated and choppy surface and will not be able to reflect things with any accuracy."

Sarah Wilson recommends reducing one's exposure to choices/decisions as a route to calm.

Peace of mind

Another term usually associated with calmness is "peace". A mind that is at peace or calm will cause the brain to produce "good" hormones, which in turn give the person a stable emotional state and promote good health in every area of life, including marriage. Seeing the rise in crime and diseases around the world which are more often than not the consequences of the emotions going 'out-of-control', it is therefore considered beneficial for many to stay calm and cultivate it in every possible situation, especially during stressful events such as demise of a family member or failure in business.

Etymology
The term comes from Middle English calme, from Old French, from Old Italian calmo, from Late Latin cauma, "heat of the day", the "resting place in the heat of the day", from Greek kauma, burning heat, from kaiein, to burn.

Cultural examples
Gibbon praised Boethius: “the sage who could artfully combine in the same work, the various riches of philosophy, poetry, and eloquence, must already have possessed the intrepid calmness, which he affected to seek”.
Rear Admiral Spruance, carrier commander at the Battle of Midway, was nicknamed Electric Brain because of his calmness in the hottest action.
Lord David Cecil saw Wuthering Heights as dominated by the contrast between what he called on the one hand “the principle of storm...and on the other, the principle of calm – of the gentle, the merciful, the passive, and the tame”.

See also

References

Positive mental attitude
Happiness
Emotions